Erebomaster is a genus of armoured harvestmen in the family Travuniidae. There are at least three described species in Erebomaster.

Species
These three species belong to the genus Erebomaster:
 Erebomaster acanthinus (Crosby & Bishop, 1924)
 Erebomaster flavescens Cope, 1872
 Erebomaster weyerensis (Packard, 1888)

References

Further reading

 
 
 
 

Harvestmen
Articles created by Qbugbot